Zeskind is a surname.

Those bearing it include:

 Leonard Zeskind (born mid-20th-century), American journalist and author
 Philip Zeskind (fl. 1980s), American psychologist
 Rachel Zeskind  (born late 20th century), American actor, writer, et al.

References